Yaara o Dildaara is a 2011 Indian drama film starring Harbhajan Maan, Tulip Joshi, Kabir Bedi, Gurpreet Ghuggi, Gulzar Inder Chahal and Jonita Doda and directed by Ksshitij Chaudhary. Initially set to be released on 9 August 2011, the film was postponed and released on 23 September 2011.

References

External links
 Yaara O Dildara Theatre Listings
 Yaara O Dildara's enigma with Mausam & Speedy Singh
 Chatur Singh Two Star on Bollywood Hungama
 Punjabi Movies Wrapup 2011

2011 films
Indian drama films
Films scored by Jaidev Kumar
2011 drama films
Punjabi-language Indian films
2010s Punjabi-language films
Films shot in Chandigarh